Durrell in Russia may refer to:

Durrell in Russia (TV series), a TV series hosted by Gerald Durrell and Lee Durrell
Durrell in Russia (book), a book written by Gerald Durrell and Lee Durrell, based on the TV series